Quaker was launched at Tynemouth in 1793 as a West Indiaman. The French captured her in 1795 but in a process that is currently obscure she returned to British ownership. In 1797 she became a slave ship, sailing out of Liverpool. On her first slave voyage the French captured after she had gathered her slaves, but the British Royal Navy recaptured her. She resumed her voyage but before she could deliver her slaves the French captured her again. She returned to British ownership in 1805, but wrecked in December 1806.

Career
Quaker first entered Lloyd's Register (LR) in 1794.

Captain Thomas Burnet acquired a letter of marque on 9 December 1793.

Lloyd's List (LL) reported on 4 February 1794 that Quaker, Burnett, master, from Cork to Barbados, had arrived at Penzance having lost her bowsprit, sails, etc., and having had to throw some of her cargo overboard. She had sailed from Cork on 26 January. 

Then about two months later, Lloyd's List reported that Union, of Boston, had arrived at Cowes from Brest with the news that Quaker, Burnett, master, from Cork to Barbados, "was carried into that port." It is not clear whether the report was in error, or whether Quaker returned to British ownership by recapture, or by other means.

Captain James Robertson sailed from Liverpool on 17 January 1797. Quaker gathered her slaves at Anomabu and Whydah. Lloyd's List reported on 29 December 1797 that Quaker, Robertson, master, of Liverpool, had been reported off Whydah by "Renoir's Squadron". African Queen was on a trading voyage to Africa, not on a slaving voyage, and returned to Bristol. Quaker continued her slave trading voyage, sailing to the West Indies, but apparently with a new master.

In 1797, 40 British slave ships were lost. Eleven were lost before they could embark any slaves. It is not clear if the loss figures are gross or net of recaptures.

The notice in the London Gazette described Quaker as "late of Liverpool". She was of 260 tons, 10 guns and a crew of 36. She was trading on the coast and had a cargo of merchandise and 337 slaves.

The next report in Lloyd's List was that Quaker, Jones, master, from Africa to Saint Kitts, had been taken and sent into .

Quaker reappeared in LR in 1805. Again, it is currently unclear by what process she had returned to British ownership.

Fate
Quaker sailed to Honduras, from Honduras to New York, and then from New York to London. On 16 December 1806 Lloyd's List reported that Quaker, Irwin, master, had been lost on the Margate Sand. Her crew and part of her cargo had been saved.

Notes

Citations

References
 
 

1793 ships
Age of Sail merchant ships
Liverpool slave ships
Captured ships
Maritime incidents in 1806